Yaritza Miguelina Reyes Ramírez (born December 17, 1993) is a Dominican actress, singer, model and beauty pageant titleholder who was crowned Miss Dominican Republic 2013 and represented the Dominican Republic at Miss Universe 2013 in Moscow, Russia. she also won Miss Mundo Dominicana 2016 and then represented Dominican Republic at Miss World 2016 in Washington, D.C., United States.

Pageantry

Miss Dominican Republic 2013
On August 3, 2013. Reyes competed for the national title of Miss Dominican Republic 2013 representing the state of Elías Piña. She was crowned as the winner and participated in the 62nd edition of the Miss Universe pageant after her victory.

She competed to succeed outgoing titleholder Olivia Culpo from the United States, eventually finishing in the Top 10. She was the third woman of predominantly African heritage to represent the Dominican Republic in Miss Universe after Ruth Ocumárez in 2002 and Ada de la Cruz in 2009.

Reina Hispanoamericana 2013
Reyes represented Dominican Republic at the Reina Hispanoamericana 2013 pageant where she was the Virreina, Alma Álvarez was supposed to be original winner but unknown if she was dethroned. It is also unknown if Reyes was appointed, or won a pageant. She

Miss World 2016
continued her pageantry career when she competed at the finale of Miss Mundo Dominicana 2016 held on June 18, 2016, Reyes was announced as the winner and represented Dominican Republic at Miss World 2016 pageant on December 18, 2016, and placed as the Miss World America's 2016 (1st Runner-Up). She was also placed in the Top 24 for both "Beauty with a Purpose" and Sport Competition.

References

External links

Dominican Republic beauty pageant winners
Miss Universe 2013 contestants
Living people
1993 births
Miss Dominican Republic
Miss World 2016 delegates